KROL (1430 AM) is a News & Talk & Classic Rock format. It is licensed to Carrollton, Missouri, United States. The station is currently owned by Miles Carter, through licensee Carter Media LLC. KROL is re-broadcast by an FM translator (K267BN, Bosworth, Missouri, 101.3 MHz).

On June 16, 2013, the then-KAOL changed their format from classic country to Contemporary Hit Radio (as "The Grenade"). Classic country moved to sister station KRLI 103.9 FM (Malta Bend, Missouri), which had started with a nostalgia/variety format and later switched to Contemporary Hit Radio. In July 4, 2019, KAOL Drop CHR For Stunting All Patty Shukla Music, on July 23, 2019, KAOL Flip To Classic Rock As & Change Letter To KROL As “1430 KROL” & Move With KOQL & KMXV Is Only Top 40 in Missouri?

KAOL had previously run a sports format until May 2011.

References

External links
 
 
 

ROL
Radio stations established in 1959
1959 establishments in Missouri
Contemporary hit radio stations in the United States